The 1941–42 season was Chelsea Football Club's third season of wartime football during the Second World War. As the Football League and the FA Cup were suspended for the duration, the club instead competed in regional competitions. Records and statistics for these matches are considered unofficial. Due to the disruption of the war, many scheduled matches were not completed and the club often fielded guest players from other clubs. Chelsea finished 13th in the 16-team London League.

Notes

References

External links
 Chelsea in the Second World War at chelseafc.com

1941–42
English football clubs 1941–42 season